To Rococo Rot were a Berlin-based band who combined electronic and analog elements to create instrumental post-rock music. Pitchfork described the band's sound as "unmistakably digital, yet 100% human." The group was composed of bassist Stefan Schneider  and brothers Robert (electronics, guitar) and Ronald Lippok (drums, effects). The band's name is a palindrome, as it can be spelled the same both forwards and backwards.

To Rococo Rot formed in 1995 and were active until 2014, releasing eight major albums and numerous collaborations, remixes, singles and EPs. They were known for their minimalist, musically engaging live show, and gave their final performance on December 17, 2014 via a live-streamed Boiler Room "In Stereo" session.

History 

While involved in the Cabaret Voltaire-inspired experimental outfit Ornament and Verbrechen, the Lippok brothers connected with then-Kreidler bassist Stefan Schneider to make a one-off record project intended to accompany a gallery exhibition. The group's eponymous debut, recorded on an ADAT without editing, was released in 1995 in the form of a picture disc, and subsequently issued on CD by Kitty Yo in 1996. During the trio's early years, Schneider continued to play in Kreidler before leaving to focus on To Rococo Rot. Ronald Lippok simultaneously recorded with Tarwater. Robert Lippok has described To Rococo Rot's approach as "a very simple way of organizing music" that focuses on just a few musical elements at a time. 

To Rococo Rot rose to prominence with three critically acclaimed albums released by UK independent label City Slang. The band's sound continued to evolve following a move to Domino Records: Hotel Morgen (2004) emphasizes the group's electronic and IDM side, while Speculation (2010) was hailed for "capturing a more live sound and looser atmosphere." The band's last full-length album, Instrument, was released in July 2014, and features Arto Lindsay on three tracks. Commenting on the uncustomary inclusion of vocals, Robert Lippok said: "The melodies Arto sang were surprising... His voice is light and is flying over the music with turns and twists, but also it is brittle and has something almost fragile about it. It's like a delicate bird."

Shortly after releasing Instrument, "a big gap of expectations" surfaced among members, and the band decided to split up. All three members have since gone on to release music through various projects.

In 2022, Bureau B released The John Peel Sessions, which collects the band's three previously-unreleased John Peel Sessions, recorded between 1997-1999. Then on December 12, 2022, To Rococo Rot reunited for a special one-time appearance at the Lieblingsplatte ("Favorite Records") Festival in Düsseldorf, where the band performed the 1999 album The Amateur View in its entirely.

Discography

Studio albums

Commissioned Projects

EPs

Singles

Compilations

See also
Sound of Water - Saint Etienne album featuring arrangements by To Rococo Rot

References

External links 
To Rococo Rot at Domino Records
Boiler Room 2014 "In Stereo" Session: To Rococo Rot's final performance (video)

German electronic musicians
German post-rock groups
Kitty-Yo artists
City Slang artists
Domino Recording Company artists